Sonic Syndicate is a Swedish heavy metal band.

Studio albums

Extended plays

Live releases

Singles

Music videos

Demos

Unreleased albums

Unreleased songs

Heavy metal group discographies
Discographies of Swedish artists